"" (Make way for the factotum) is an aria from The Barber of Seville by Gioachino Rossini, sung at the first entrance of the title character, Figaro. The repeated "Figaro"s before the final patter section are an icon in popular culture of operatic singing. The term "factotum" refers to a general servant and comes from Latin where it literally means "do everything".

Music

Because of the constant singing of eighth notes in  meter at an allegro vivace tempo, the piece is often noted as one of the most difficult baritone arias to perform. This, along with the tongue-twisting nature of some of the lines, insisting on Italian superlatives (always ending in "-issimo"), have made it a pièce de résistance in which a skilled baritone has the chance to highlight all of his qualities.

The aria is written in C major. The voice range covers D3 to G4 (optional A4), with a very high tessitura. For this reason, a few dramatic tenors have also sung the aria, notably Mario Del Monaco and Plácido Domingo.

Libretto
The libretto to the opera was written by Cesare Sterbini.

Original lyrics
Largo al factotum della città.
Presto a bottega che l'alba è già.
Ah, che bel vivere, che bel piacere
per un barbiere di qualità!

Ah, bravo Figaro! Bravo, bravissimo!
Fortunatissimo per verità!

Pronto a far tutto, la notte e il giorno
sempre d'intorno in giro sta.
Miglior cuccagna per un barbiere,
vita più nobile, no, non si da.

Rasori e pettini, lancette e forbici,
al mio comando tutto qui sta.
V'è la risorsa, poi, del mestiere
colla donnetta ... col cavaliere ...

Tutti mi chiedono, tutti mi vogliono,
donne, ragazzi, vecchi, fanciulle:
Qua la parrucca ... Presto la barba ...
Qua la sanguigna ... Presto il biglietto ...
Figaro! Figaro! Figaro!, ecc.

Ahimè, che furia! Ahimè, che folla!
Uno alla volta, per carità!
Ehi, Figaro! Son qua.
Figaro qua, Figaro là,
Figaro su, Figaro giù.

Pronto prontissimo son come il fulmine:
sono il factotum della città.
Ah, bravo Figaro! Bravo, bravissimo;
a te fortuna non mancherà.
Sono il factotum della città!
Literal translation
Make way for the city's servant.
Off to the shop soon. It is already dawn.
Ah, what a beautiful life, what lovely pleasure
For a barber of quality!

Ah, worthy Figaro! Worthy, superb!
Most fortunate for sure!

Ready to do anything, night and day,
Always around and about.
A better Cockaigne for a barber,
A nobler life, there is none.

Razors and combs, lancets and scissors
Are all here at my command.
There is also resourcefulness, in the trade,
With the young lady, with the young man.

Everyone asks for me. Everyone wants me:
Women, boys, the elderly, girls.
Here this wig; quickly this beard;
Here this bleeding, quickly this note;
"Figaro! Figaro! Figaro!" etc.

Alas, what a fury! Alas, what a crowd!
One at a time, for charity's sake!
"Hey, Figaro!" Here I am!
Figaro here, Figaro there,
Figaro up, Figaro down.

Swift, swifter, like lightning I am.
I am the city's servant.
Ah, worthy Figaro! Worthy, superb;
Fortune will not fail you.
I am the city's servant!
Singable translation
I'm the factotum of all the town, make way!
Quick now to business, morning hath shown, 'tis day.
Oh, 'tis a charming life, brimful of pleasure,
that of a barber, used to high life.

No-one can vie with the brilliant Figaro, no, none.
Always in luck where good fortune is rife. Well done!

Early and late, for all who require me,
Nothing can tire me.
Of all the professions that can be mentioned,
That of a barber is best of all.

Scissors in hand, 'mongst my combs and my razors,
I stand at the door, when customers call.
Then there are cases, quite diplomatic,
Here damsel sighing, there swain ecstatic.

I am in such request, nor night nor day I've rest,
old men and maidens, matrons and gallants.
"Have you my wig there?" "Quick here and shave me."
"I've got a headache." "Run with this letter."
Figaro, Figaro, Figaro, etc.

No more this clamor! I'll bear no longer!
For pity's sake, speak one at a time!
Eh Figaro! I'm here.
Figaro here, Figaro there,
Figaro high, Figaro low.

I'm indispensable, irreprehensible,
I'm the factotum of all the town.
Ah bravo, Figaro, bravo, bravissimo,
thou art a favorite of Fortune.
I'm the factotum of all the town.

Legacy
Beyond its frequent operatic and orchestral performances, the aria has appeared in cartoons and live-action films. The first example of the song appearing in a animated cartoon is Notes to You, released in 1941, where a cat annoys Porky Pig out of his slumber. The most popular examples in animation are The Barber of Seville (a 1944 film with Woody Woodpecker acting as an mischievous barber), the final segment from the 1946 Disney film Make Mine Music, "The Whale Who Wanted to Sing at the Met", Magical Maestro (1952), One Froggy Evening (1955), and The Cat Above and the Mouse Below (1964). In the opening animated sequence by Chuck Jones of Mrs. Doubtfire (1993), Robin Williams plays a canary singing the song. Examples in film are For the Love of Mary (1948, by actress/soprano Deanna Durbin), Hopscotch (1980), and Oscar (1991).

References

External links
Translation of "Largo al factotum", Aria-Database.com
Il barbiere di Siviglia, Italian text, with an English translation, Oliver Ditson, Boston, 1860, "Largo al factotum" on pp. 8–9
, Gino Quilico

Arias by Gioacchino Rossini
Baritone arias
Opera excerpts
1816 compositions
Humor in classical music
Patter songs
Compositions in C major
The Barber of Seville